is a former Japanese professional baseball player. He played pitcher for the Yokohama DeNA BayStars.

External links

 NPB.com

1986 births
Living people
Baseball people from Ibaraki Prefecture
Waseda University alumni
Japanese baseball players
Nippon Professional Baseball pitchers
Yokohama BayStars players
Yokohama DeNA BayStars players
Asian Games medalists in baseball
Baseball players at the 2010 Asian Games
Medalists at the 2010 Asian Games
Asian Games bronze medalists for Japan